Nanditha Bose is an Indian actress in Malayalam movies. She was a prominent lead actress during the 1970s in Malayalam, Tamil, Hindi and Bengali films. She was well noted for her performance in the Malayalam movies Achaani (1973), Panitheeratha Veedu (1973) and Dharmayudham (1973). Currently, she is busy acting in Television serials.

Personal life
Nanditha is from Bengal, India. She was married to D. P. Bose but the marriage ended in divorce. The couple has a son, Debasis Bose  and a daughter, Debarati (née) Bose.

Awards
 1973 ; Filmfare Award for Best Actress - Swapnam

Filmography

Malayalam

 Ashwaroodan (2006)
 Paithrukam (1993)
 Kalpana House (1989)
 Isabella (1988) as Maggie
 Oozham (1988)
 Ithrayum Kaalam (1987) as Mariya
 Neram Pularumpol (1986)
 Ithramathram (1986) as Sharada
 Paavam Krooran (1984)
 NH 47 (1984) as Sumathi
 Parasparam (1983)
 Manju (1983)
 Kelkkaatha Sabdham (1982) as Jeyanthi's Mother
 Beedikunjamma (1982) as Susheela
 Kelkkaatha Shabdam (1982)
 Odukkam Thudakkam (1982)
 Parvathy (1981) as Subadra Bhai
 Kaahalam (1981)
 Maniyan Pilla Adhava Maniyan Pilla (1981) as Padmam
 Manassinte Theerthayaathra (1981)
 Valarthumrigangal (1981) as Lakshmi
 Thadavara (1981) as Nandini
 Air Hostess (1980) as Kamala
 Cheppu (1987)
 Angadi (1980)
 Iniyaathra (1979)
 Enikku Njaan Swantham (1979) as Leela
 Simhasanam (1979) as Savithri
 Nakshathrangale Kaaval (1978)
 Etho Oru Swapnam (1978)
 Sujatha (1977)
 Agninakshathram (1977)
 Akale Aakaasham (1977)
 Aparaadhi (1977)
 Vazhivilakku (1976)
 Kaamam Krodham Moham (1975)
 Prayanam (1975)
 Poonthenaruvi (1974) as Valsamma
 Chanchala (1974)
 Swapnam (1973) as Gauri
 Dharmayudham (1973) as Meenu
 Achaani (1973) as Seetha
 Chenda (1973)
 Panitheeratha Veedu (1973) as Rachel

Tamil
 Savithiri (1980) as Meenakshi 
 Nangooram (1979) as Shanthi
 Ganga Yamuna Kaveri (1978) as Kaveri
 Oru Kudumbathin Kadhai (1975) as Anandhi
 Dhaagam (1974) as Sharada

Kannada
 Mother (1980)
 Punardatta (1976)

Hindi
 Dil Kaa Heera (1979)  
 Aisa Bhi Hota Hain (1971)

Bengali
 Pankhiraj (1980)  
 Nidhiram Sardar (1976)  
 Kanna (1962)

References

External links

Actresses in Malayalam cinema
Indian film actresses
Actresses in Tamil cinema
Living people
Year of birth missing (living people)
Bengali actresses
Actresses in Bengali cinema
Actresses in Hindi cinema
Actresses in Kannada cinema
20th-century Indian actresses